The 1960 Baylor Bears football team represented Baylor University during the 1960 NCAA University Division football season. The Bears were led by second-year head coach John Bridgers and played their home games at Baylor Stadium in Waco, Texas. They competed as members of the Southwest Conference, finishing in second and ranked 12th in the final AP Poll with a regular season record of 8–2 (5–2 SWC). They were invited to the 1960 Gator Bowl, where they lost to Florida, 12–13.

Schedule

References

Baylor
Baylor Bears football seasons
Baylor Bears football